is a junction passenger railway station located in Takatsu-ku, Kawasaki, Kanagawa Prefecture, Japan, operated by the private railway operator Tokyu Corporation.

Lines
Mizonokuchi Station is served by the Tōkyū Den-en-toshi Line and Tōkyū Ōimachi Line. It is 11.4 kilometers from the starting point of the Tōkyū Den-en-toshi Line at Shibuya Station, and is the starting point of Tōkyū Ōimachi Line services, which branch off at Futako-Tamagawa Station. Musashi-Mizonokuchi Station on the JR East Nambu Line is located adjacent to it.

Station layout
Mizonokuchi Station has two opposed elevated island platforms serving four tracks. The platforms are connected to the station building by underpasses.

Platforms

History 
The Japanese name was changed to the present format on January 20, 1966. Initially built with a single side platform, the station was expanded in 1992 to four tracks and two island platforms.

Passenger statistics
In fiscal 2019, the station was used by an average of 155,777 passengers daily for the Den-en-Toshi Line and 57,731 passengers daily for the Ōimachi Line 

The daily average passenger figures for previous years are as shown below.

Surrounding area
Musashi-Mizonokuchi Station

See also
 List of railway stations in Japan

References

External links

 

Railway stations in Kanagawa Prefecture
Railway stations in Japan opened in 1966
Tokyu Den-en-toshi Line
Railway stations in Kawasaki, Kanagawa